The following are the statistics of Swedish football Division 2 for the 2008 season.

League standings

Division 2 Norrland

Division 2 Norra Svealand

Division 2 Östra Svealand

Division 2 Östra Götaland

Division 2 Västra Götaland

Division 2 Södra Götaland

Player of the year awards

Ever since 2003 the online bookmaker Unibet have given out awards at the end of the season to the best players in Division 2. The recipients are decided by a jury of sportsjournalists, coaches and football experts. The names highlighted in green won the overall national award.

References

Sweden - List of final tables (RSSSF)

Swedish Football Division 2 seasons
4
Sweden
Sweden